TPA-023 (MK-0777) is an anxiolytic drug with a novel chemical structure, which is used in scientific research. It has similar effects to benzodiazepine drugs, but is structurally distinct and so is classed as a nonbenzodiazepine anxiolytic. It is a subtype-selective, mixed allosteric modular  at the benzodiazepine location on GABAA receptors, where it acts as a partial agonist at the α2 and α3 subtypes, but as a silent antagonist at α1 and α5 subtypes. It has primarily anxiolytic and anticonvulsant effects in animal tests, but with no sedative effects even at 50 times the effective anxiolytic dose.

In human trials on healthy volunteers, TPA-023 was comparable to lorazepam, but had much less side effects on cognition, memory, alertness or coordination. In Phase II trials, the compound was significantly superior to placebo without inducing sedation. The clinical development was halted due to preclinical toxicity (cataract) in long term dosing studies. TPA-023 is well absorbed following oral administration and extensively metabolised by the liver, with a half-life of 6.7 hours. The main enzyme involved in its metabolism is CYP3A4, with some contribution by CYP3A5.

References 

Anxiolytics
Ethers
Fluoroarenes
Triazoles
Triazolopyridazines
GABAA receptor positive allosteric modulators
Tert-butyl compounds